Utkir Tukhtamurodovich Sultonov (14 July 1939 – 29 November 2015) was an Uzbek politician who served as the Prime Minister of Uzbekistan from 21 December 1995 until he was fired from his position on 12 December 2003.

Cabinet included
 Abdulaziz Kamilov - foreign minister from 1994 until 2003
 Sodiq Safoyev - since March 2003

See also
 List of current heads of state and government

References 

1940 births
2015 deaths
Politicians from Tashkent
Prime Ministers of Uzbekistan
Tomsk Polytechnic University alumni
Soviet engineers
Engineers from Tashkent